Jalalpore is one of the 182 Legislative Assembly constituencies of Gujarat state in India. It is part of Navsari district.

List of segments
This assembly seat represents the following segments,

 Jalalpore Taluka
 Navsari Taluka (Part) Villages – Asundar, Sarai, Dhaman, Parthan, Vejalpor, Telada, Sarona, Pera, Kurel, Supa, Pinsad, Padgha, Kadipor, Amri, Amadpor, Moldhara, Tarsadi, Khergam, Vachharvad, Shahu, Singod, Dandesar, Onchi, Virwadi, Dharagiri, Nasilpor, Bhattai, Munsad, Vasar, Ambada, Ugat, Navapara, Sisodra (Ganesh), Tighra, Arsan.

Member of Legislative Assembly
2007 - R.C. Patel, Bharatiya Janata Party
2012 - R.C. Patel, Bharatiya Janata Party

Election results

2022 
 

<

2017

2012

See also
 List of constituencies of Gujarat Legislative Assembly
 Gujarat Legislative Assembly

References

External links
 

Assembly constituencies of Gujarat
Navsari district